Ivan L. R. Lemelle (born 1950) is a senior United States district judge of the United States District Court for the Eastern District of Louisiana.

Early life and education

Born in Opelousas, Louisiana, Lemelle received a Bachelor of Science degree from Xavier University of Louisiana in 1971 and a Juris Doctor from Loyola University New Orleans School of Law in 1974. He was a law clerk for Robert Collins of the Orleans Parish Criminal District Court from 1972 to 1974.

Career

Lemelle was an Assistant district attorney of Orleans Parish from 1974 to 1977. He was in private practice in New Orleans from 1977 to 1981. He was an assistant city attorney of New Orleans from 1977 to 1978. He was an assistant state attorney general of Louisiana Department of Justice from 1980 to 1984.

Federal judicial service

United States magistrate judge service
Lemelle served as United States Magistrate of the United States District Court for the Eastern District of Louisiana from 1984 to 1998.

District court service
On February 12, 1997, Lemelle was nominated by President Bill Clinton to a seat on the United States District Court for the Eastern District of Louisiana vacated by Veronica D. Wicker. He was confirmed by the United States Senate on April 3, 1998, and received his commission on April 7, 1998. He assumed senior status on June 29, 2015.

Notable cases

During 2009, Lemelle was assigned the Racketeer Influenced and Corrupt Organizations Act (RICO) case alleged against Renée Gill Pratt and Mose Jefferson, brother of former U.S. representative William J. Jefferson, who simultaneously stood indicted on sixteen counts in federal court in Virginia. On 2009 July 28, Lemelle delayed the start of the racketeering trial to 2010 January 25. In two separate trials during August 2009, William J. Jefferson was convicted on 11 felony counts related to bribery; Mose Jefferson, on four.

In 2009, Lemelle heard a real estate fraud case against Michael O'Keefe, Jr. (born c. 1959), the son of former Louisiana State Senate President Michael H. O'Keefe, Sr. The younger O'Keefe was at the time the president of Citywide Mortgage Company of New Orleans. He pleaded guilty to making false statements during a transaction with the United States Department of Housing and Urban Development. The scam involved fraudulent appraisals, credit documents, and loan applications. O'Keefe was ordered to pay nearly $700,000 in restitution. He also served in prison for nearly two years.

On September 11, 2009, Lemelle visited Kentwood High School and   O. W. Dillon Memorial Elementary School (both in Kentwood, Louisiana), Roseland Elementary School (in Roseland, Louisiana), and Northwood Preparatory High School (in Amite, Louisiana)—all in Tangipahoa Parish. The three schools are subject to potential changes, depending on Lemelle's ruling on a 4-decades-old desegregation-related settlement.

Legacy
In November 2020, it was proposed by the New Orleans City Council Street Renaming Commission that Capdevielle Street (named after Paul Capdevielle, a Confederate hero and former mayor) be renamed for Lemelle. He was the only living person proposed for such an honor. The decision process was ongoing as of February 2021.

He was also chosen to throw the ceremonial first pitch at his alma mater's first baseball game in over 60 years, in February 2021, after they decided to revive the sport at the school.

Personal life
Lemelle is Catholic, raised in Holy Ghost Catholic Church in Opelousas, the largest Black Catholic church in the country.

See also 
 List of African-American federal judges
 List of African-American jurists

References

Sources

1950 births
Living people
20th-century American judges
21st-century American judges
African-American Catholics
African-American judges
Catholics from Louisiana
Judges of the United States District Court for the Eastern District of Louisiana
Loyola University New Orleans College of Law alumni
People from Opelousas, Louisiana
United States district court judges appointed by Bill Clinton
United States magistrate judges
Xavier University of Louisiana alumni